The Bristol Type 159 was a British design for a four-engined heavy bomber by the Bristol Aeroplane Company, of Filton, Bristol. A mockup was built but the project was cancelled and no aircraft were built.

Design and development
In March 1939 the British Air Ministry issued specification B.1/39 for a heavy bomber to replace the Avro Manchester, Short Stirling and Handley Page Halifax. Bristol had submitted the Type 159, sometimes known as the Beaubomber which was a low-wing monoplane with a twin tail, using mainly components used by the Bristol Beaufort.  It had a nosewheel landing gear with the entire 15,000lb bomb-load stored inside the inner wing. Four Hercules engines were the proposed engines with the ability to interchange with Rolls-Royce Griffons. The crew, apart from the bomb aimer, would be housed in an armoured monocoque structure with both a dorsal and a ventral gun turret. The Type 159 and the Handley Page HP.60 design, a variant of the Halifax, were selected and the intention was to order two prototypes of each for evaluation. The Type 159 passed wind-tunnel for stability and low drag and with design well advanced a full-scale mock-up was ready by early 1940.

It was intended to build a half-scale aircraft for flight testing but with the Ministry of Aircraft Production (MAP) concentrating on the production of fighters, further work on the Type 159 was stopped and the mockup dismantled in May 1940.

Specifications (Proposed)

References

Notes

Bibliography

Type 159
1940s British bomber aircraft